The maugean skate or Port Davey skate (Zearaja maugeana) is a species of fish in the family Rajidae. Its natural habitat is estuarine waters. It is endemic to Tasmania, only found in Macquarie Harbour and Bathurst Harbour. The species was discovered in 1988 by Dr Graham Edgar.

Diet
The Maugean skate holds a high trophic position in the food web (3.70). Their diet consists of benthic prey species, with crustaceans as their dominant prey type.

Sources
 Gledhill, D. & Last, P. 2000.  Dipturus sp. nov. L.   2006 IUCN Red List of Threatened Species.   Downloaded on 3 August 2007.

Weltz Kay, Lyle Jeremy M., Bell Justin D., Semmens Jayson M. (2018) Dietary analysis reveals the vulnerability of the endangered Maugean skate (Zearaja maugeana) to benthic changes in Macquarie Harbour. Marine and Freshwater Research 70, 745-753.

maugean skate
Vertebrates of Tasmania
Endangered fauna of Australia
Taxonomy articles created by Polbot
maugean skate
Taxobox binomials not recognized by IUCN